The 2003 UCI Road World Championships took place in Hamilton, Ontario, Canada, between October 7 and October 12, 2003. The event consisted of a road race and a time trial for men, women, men under 23, junior men and junior women.

David Millar was handed a two-year ban and stripped of his world time trial title by the British cycling federation for taking the banned performance enhancer EPO. Following this disqualification, the UCI declared Michael Rogers as the winner with the silver medal going to Uwe Peschel and the bronze to Michael Rich.

Events summary

References

External links
 2003 Road World Championships by cyclingnews.com

 
UCI Road World Championships by year
World Championships
Uci Road World Championships, 2003
International cycle races hosted by Canada
2003 in Ontario